Cervid alphaherpesvirus 2 (CvHV-2) is a species of virus in the genus Varicellovirus, subfamily Alphaherpesvirinae, family Herpesviridae, and order Herpesvirales.

References

External links
 

Alphaherpesvirinae